Cara Black and Liezel Huber are the defending champions, but lost in the semifinals to Samantha Stosur and Rennae Stubbs

Seeds

  Cara Black /  Liezel Huber (semifinals)
  Květa Peschke /  Lisa Raymond (withdrew)
  Anabel Medina Garrigues /  Virginia Ruano Pascual (first round)
  Samantha Stosur /  Rennae Stubbs (final)

Draw

Draw

External links
 Draw

Aegon International
Doubles